Chongjin concentration camp (Chosŏn'gŭl: , also spelled Ch'ŏngjin) is a labour camp in North Korea for political prisoners. The official name is Kwan-li-so (Penal-labour colony) No. 25. Satellite images show a major expansion of the camp after 2010.

Location

The camp is located in the city of Chongjin in the North Hamgyong province of North Korea.

Description
Chongjin camp is a lifetime prison. Like the other political prison camps it is controlled by the state security agency. But while the other camps include many vast prison-labour colonies in remote mountain valleys, Chongjin camp is only one big prison building complex similar to the reeducation camps. The camp is around 500 m (1500 ft) long and 500 m (1500 ft) wide, surrounded by high walls and fences, and equipped with guard towers.  The number of prisoners is estimated to be between 3000 and 5000.

Purpose
The main purpose of the camp is to isolate political prisoners from society. The prisoners are exploited for hard labour to be performed in the prison factories. Popular North Korean consumer products like Kalmaegi bicycles are manufactured by prisoners using hand tools.

Human rights situation
Ahn Myung-chul (a former prison guard in Hoeryong concentration camp) described Chongjin camp as a top-level political prisoner camp, therefore harsh conditions can be assumed.

Camp expansion
Detailed analysis of satellite images shows a major expansion of the camp perimeter in 2010. Along the new fence line, 17 additional guard posts were erected. In the eastern part of the new perimeter, several new buildings were erected from 2011 to 2013, possibly to be used as prisoner housing.

Prisoners (witnesses)
There are no first-hand witness accounts on the camp; however, there are some reports by North Korean defectors on prisoners in Chongjin camp. Lim Kook-jae, a South Korean abducted to North Korea in 1987 aboard the Dong Jin 27, died in Chongjin camp, according to a human rights organization. Many pastors and presbyters, dissident Korean-Japanese, and people expelled from Pyongyang with their families are detained in Chongjin camp, according to the 9th International Conference on North Korean Human Rights and Refugees.

See also

 Human rights in North Korea
 Prisons in North Korea
 Yodok concentration camp
 Kaechon internment camp
 Camp 22

References

External links
 Committee for Human Rights in North Korea – Overview on North Korean Prison Camps with Testimonies and Satellite Photographs
 Database Center for North Korean Human Rights (NKDB) - Political prison camps in North Korea Today
 Digital Globe Analytics - Detailed satellite image analysis of North Korea's Camp No. 25
  Korea Institute for National Unification - White paper on human rights in North Korea 2011
 One Free Korea - Camp 25 at Chongjin (with satellite photographs)
 The Daily NK: The Hub of North Korean News – News about North Korea and human rights

Concentration camps in North Korea
North Hamgyong